Eric Matthews (born 1933) was a former wrestler from New Zealand.

He competed at the 1950 British Empire Games where he won the silver medal in the men's flyweight or 52 kg grade.

References

Commonwealth Games silver medallists for New Zealand
Wrestlers at the 1950 British Empire Games
New Zealand male sport wrestlers
Commonwealth Games medallists in wrestling
1933 births
Living people
Medallists at the 1950 British Empire Games